Aglaia parviflora is a species of plant in the family Meliaceae. It is found in Indonesia, Papua New Guinea, and the Solomon Islands.

References

parviflora
Near threatened plants
Taxonomy articles created by Polbot